Apatopygus occidentalis is a species of sea urchin of the family Apatopygidae. Their armour is covered with spines. It is placed in the genus Apatopygus and lives in the sea. Apatopygus occidentalis was first scientifically described in 1928 by Hubert Lyman Clark, American zoologist.

References 

Apatopygidae
Animals described in 1928
Taxa named by Hubert Lyman Clark